Lewis C. Holder (October 10, 1923 – March 29, 2018) was an American football end who played one season with the Los Angeles Dons. He played college football at the University of Texas, having previously attended Woodrow Wilson High School in Dallas, Texas.

References

1923 births
2018 deaths
American football ends
Texas Longhorns football players
Los Angeles Dons players
Players of American football from Dallas